George Grantham Bain (January 7, 1865 – April 20, 1944) was a New York City photographer. He was known as "the father of foreign photographic news".

Biography
He was born in Chicago, Illinois, on January 7, 1865, to George Bain and Clara Mather. His family moved from Chicago to St. Louis, Missouri. He attended Saint Louis University as an undergraduate to study chemistry, and later attained a law degree from the same institution.

After graduation, Bain became a reporter at the St. Louis Globe-Democrat. The following year he moved to the St. Louis Post-Dispatch, where he became the Washington, DC correspondent. He worked for United Press before he started the Bain News Service in 1898.

He died at age 79, on April 20, 1944, at Bellevue Hospital in Manhattan.

George Grantham Bain Collection
The George Grantham Bain Collection at the Library of Congress Prints and Photographs Division comprises approximately 40,000 glass plate negatives and 50,000 photographic prints. Most are scanned and have been made available online. Most date from the 1900s to the mid-1920s, but some are as early as the 1860s, and some as late as the 1930s. 

The majority of Bain's images depict events in New York City, but he also copied extant images of worldwide events for news distribution purposes. "The Bain picture files richly document local sports events, theater, celebrities, crime, strikes, disasters, political activities including the woman suffrage campaign, conventions and public celebrations," the library notes.

There are no known copyright restrictions on the photographs in the Collection, although some of Bain's most important images had historically been marked with a copyright notice to prevent unauthorized distribution.

Gallery

References

External links 

 George Grantham Bain photograph archive at the Library of Congress
 George Grantham Bain photograph archive at Flickr
 
 Bain News Service at LC Authorities, with 30,000 records

1865 births
1944 deaths
American photographers
American lawyers
Library of Congress
Saint Louis University alumni
Artists from Chicago
St. Louis Post-Dispatch people